Glischropus bucephalus, the Indochinese thick-thumbed bat, is a species of bat in the family Vespertilionidae. The bat is found in Cambodia, Myanmar, Laos, Thailand and Vietnam north of the Isthmus of Kra.

Taxonomy 
Specimens of this species were formerly considered to be G. tylopus, but are now a distinct species, with G. tylopus restricted to the south of the Isthmus of Kra.

Habitat and distribution 
The bat is found in Cambodia, Myanmar, Laos, Thailand and Vietnam north of the Isthmus of Kra. 

The bat is widespread and most probably roosts in bamboo forests.

Conservation 
The species may be threatened by the destruction of bamboo forests.

References 

Mammals described in 2011
Glischropus
Bats of Southeast Asia